"Self-Made" is a song by American singer Bryson Tiller. The track appeared on Tiller's second studio album, True to Self, which was released on May 26, 2017. It was written by Tiller, Philip Coleman, Jr., Konstandinos Dimopoulos and Stavros Xarchakos. The song received positive response from music critics, who praised Tiller's rapping skills. The black-and-white music video for the song, directed by Colin Tilley, premiered on October 3, 2017. "Self-Made" debuted at number 75 on the Billboard Hot 100 chart.

Background and release

On January 17, 2017, Tiller announced that he is working on his second album, titled True to Self. On May 11, 2017, he revealed the album's artwork, announcing that it would be released on June 23. On May 23, Tiller posted the complete tracklist on his Instagram account, and released the album on May 26, a month early before the intended release. Tiller co-wrote "Self-Made" with Philip Coleman, Jr., Konstandinos Dimopoulos and Stavros Xarchakos, with production handled by NES.

Critical reception
Siena Yates from The New Zealand Herald called it one of the best songs from the album, also praising the production of the song and Tiller's rapping skills. Ryan B. Patrick of Exclaim! wrote that although the song "rides a strong rap flow and hits hard in moment, it leaves your consciousness just as fast as it arrived". Music Times' Dayna Haffenden noted that the song "sounds like the hidden aggression that any normal artist goes through as they figure themselves out", as well as writing that "Tiller's flow gives off that "hardcore rapper" appeal".

Commercial performance
"Self-Made" debuted and peaked at number 85 on the Billboard Hot 100 chart on June 17, 2017. It has sold over 500,000 copies and was certified gold by the RIAA in February 2018.

Music video

The music video for the song, directed by Colin Tilley, premiered via Tiller's Vevo channel on October 3, 2017. The black-and-white video starts with Tiller getting out of the house and performing the song in the hood full of cars and women as it is raining. He is also seen in a room sitting on the bed surrounded by women. The video also features Tiller standing on the top of a moving BMW i8 and riding a Jet Ski through the streets as he gets chased by police.

Live performances
On July 7, 2017, Tiller performed "Self-Made" during his set at the Wireless Festival in London. On August 14, 2017, he performed the song on the Jimmy Kimmel Live!. On November 11, 2017, he performed it at the BBC 1Xtra Live in Manchester. The song was also part of Tiller's Set It Off Tour (2017).

Charts

Weekly charts

Certifications

References

External links

2017 songs
Bryson Tiller songs
Songs written by Bryson Tiller